An alameda is a street or path lined with trees and may refer to:

Places

Canada
Alameda, Saskatchewan, town in Saskatchewan
Grant Devine Dam, formerly Alameda Dam, a dam and reservoir in southern Saskatchewan

Chile
 Alameda (Santiago), Santiago, Chile's main avenue, whose official name is Avenida Libertador General Bernardo O'Higgins

Spain
Alameda, Andalusia, a town and municipality in the province of Málaga
Alameda de Pontevedra, a public park in Pontevedra
La Alameda, Seville, a neighbourhood in Seville

United States

Inhabited places
Alameda, California, a city in Alameda County, California
Alameda (island), an island making up most of the city's area
Naval Air Station Alameda, a former United States navy base
Alameda, Kern County, California, a community in Kern County, California
Alameda County, California, county in the state of California in the United States
Alameda Park, a public park in Santa Barbara, California
Rancho Arroyo de la Alameda, name of a Spanish land grant in the San Francisco Bay Area
Alameda (Miami), a neighborhood in the city of Miami, Florida
Alameda, Idaho, a former city in Idaho
Almeda University, a non-accredited educational institution addressed in Alameda, Idaho
Alameda, New Mexico, a village in New Mexico
Alameda, Portland, Oregon, a neighborhood in Portland, Oregon

Streets
 The Alameda (San Jose), a major arterial road between downtown San Jose and Santa Clara, California
 Alameda de las Pulgas, sometimes called The Alameda, a street between San Carlos and Menlo Park, California
 Alameda Street, a major thoroughfare in Los Angeles County, California
 Alameda Corridor, a freight railroad in a trench adjacent to Alameda Street. 
 The Alameda (Baltimore), a street in North Baltimore, Maryland
 Colorado State Highway 26 (Alameda Avenue), a city street and major thoroughfare in Denver, Colorado

Other places
Alameda Central, a public park in Mexico City
Gibraltar Botanic Gardens, a botanical garden in Gibraltar also called La Alameda Gardens
Alameda, neighbourhood in Lisbon, Portugal

Ships
USS Alameda, the name of various United States Navy ships
Alameda / Oakland Ferry, San Francisco Bay Ferry, California
Alameda Harbor Bay Ferry, San Francisco Bay Ferry, California

Transit
 Alameda railway station, main train station of Santiago, Chile
 Alameda (Lisbon Metro), Lisbon, Portugal
 Alameda metro station (Monterrey), Mexico
 Alameda (RTD), a transit station in Denver, Colorado, United States
 Alameda Corridor, a freight rail line in Los Angeles, California, United States
 Alameda, a Metrovalencia metro station in Valencia, Spain
 La Alameda metro station (Quito), Ecuador

Other uses
 Alameda Research, a quantitative trading firm, founded by Sam Bankman-Fried
 Irene Zoe Alameda (born 1974), Spanish writer and film director
 College of Alameda,  a two-year community college located in Alameda, California, in the United States
 "Alameda", a song by Elliott Smith from the 1997 album Either/Or
 The Alameda Newspaper Group (ANG Newspapers), publisher of several newspapers in the San Francisco Bay area in California, United States

See also
 Alameda Creek, San Francisco Bay area, California
 The Alameda (disambiguation)
 Alamo (disambiguation)